Jonathan Huntington was born in Windham, Connecticut February 9, 1771 and died in St. Louis, Missouri July 29, 1838. He was a tenor and one of the first American composers.

Publications
The Apollo Harmony (1806)
Classical Church Music (1812)
The Albany Collection of Sacred Harmony (1800)

References

1771 births
1838 deaths
American male composers
American composers
People from Windham, Connecticut